National institutes or central institutes are institutes established by the Government of India and supported by national agencies such as CSIR, ESIC, ICAR, MoHFW, DBT
DST, ICMR, DAE, MHRD, MHA  etc. including the Institutes of National Importance. Listed below are some of the centrally-funded institutes along with their location. Number of Institutes increased in each category of CFTI, NIT, IIIT and IIT institutes.

References

Institutes funded by the Central Government
Institutes funded by the Central Government